Nain Airport  is located on the shore of Unity Bay near Nain, Newfoundland and Labrador, Canada.

Replacement
A study was completed in 2007 to identify alternate sites for the Nain Airstrip. Two potential sites met the attributes for a more detailed analysis.

In October 2018, the Nunatsiavut Government commissioned OCTANT Aviation Inc. to update an earlier study for this airstrip. The study concluded that the current airstrip’s location prohibits required upgrades to enable 24 hour operations and permit larger aircraft. A new airstrip would have to be located outside the community and would require the construction of a new airstrip access road.

In 2020, the Nunatsiavut government partnering with the Atlantic Canada Opportunities Agency (ACOA) funded a pre-feasibility study which determined the current airstrip was unsuitable for upgrades, but identified a potential site to develop about seven kilometres southwest of Nain.

Currently, the Nunatsiavut government is attempting to secure funding for a full feasibility study.

Airlines and destinations

References

External links

Certified airports in Newfoundland and Labrador